Barbara Sherwood Lollar,  (born February 19, 1963) is a Canadian geologist and academic known for her research into billion-year-old water. She is currently a Professor in the Department of Earth Sciences at the University of Toronto. In 2007, she was made a Canada Research Chair in Isotope Geochemistry of the Earth and the Environment. It was renewed in 2014.

Early life and education
Sherwood Lollar was born in Kingston, Ontario, the daughter of John M Sherwood and Joan Sherwood, historians and academic at Queen's University, Kingston, she joined the University of Toronto in 1992 after receiving a Bachelor of Arts degree in Geological Sciences from Harvard University, a Ph.D. in Earth Sciences from University of Waterloo in 1990, and a postdoctoral fellow at University of Cambridge.

Career
She has frequently collaborated with Tullis Onstott and Lisa Pratt on large multi-national research projects.

Honours
In 2004, she was made a Fellow of Royal Society of Canada. In 2010, she was made a Senior Fellow of Massey College. In 2012, she was awarded the ENI award. In 2015, she was made a Fellow of the American Geophysical Union. In 2016, she was awarded the Natural Sciences and Engineering Research Council's John C. Polanyi Award. In 2016, she was invested as a Companion of the Order of Canada "for her revolutionary contributions to geochemistry, notably in the development of innovative mechanisms for groundwater remediation, and for her discovery of ancient fluids that hold implications for life on other planets". Also in 2016, she was awarded the Bancroft Award by the Royal Society of Canada. She received the Logan Medal in 2018.

She was elected a fellow of the Royal Society in 2019. In 2021, she was elected a member of the National Academy of Engineering for contributions to understanding of the evolution of Earth's groundwater and atmosphere.

On 6 May 2019, Lollar received the Gerhard Herzberg Canada Gold Medal for Science and Engineering from the Natural Sciences and Engineering Research Council of Canada.

References

External links
 
 Sherwood Lollar Research Group

Living people
1963 births
Scientists from Ontario
People from Kingston, Ontario
Alumni of the University of Cambridge
Canadian geochemists
Canada Research Chairs
Companions of the Order of Canada
Fellows of the American Geophysical Union
Fellows of the Royal Society of Canada
Harvard University alumni
Massey College, Toronto
Academic staff of the University of Toronto
University of Waterloo alumni
Women earth scientists
20th-century Canadian geologists
20th-century Canadian women scientists
21st-century Canadian geologists
21st-century Canadian women scientists
Female Fellows of the Royal Society
Canadian Fellows of the Royal Society
Presidents of the Geochemical Society